Charles Rowland Twidale is an Australian geomorphologist active at the University of Adelaide. Twidale's research  has covered varied subjects including structural geomorphology, weathering, ancient landscapes in shield regions, granite landforms in deserts, paleosurfaces and the history of geomorphology. Twidale has been most active investigating the geomorphology of Australia and Spain.

In 1976 C. R. Twidale was president of the Royal Society of South Australia.

In 1993 he was awarded the Mueller Medal by the Australian and New Zealand Association for the Advancement of Science.

References

External links

Australian geomorphologists
Historians of science
Academic staff of the University of Adelaide
Alumni of the University of Bristol
Living people
Year of birth missing (living people)